The 2009 European Short Track Speed Skating Championships took place between 16 and 18 January 2009 in Turin, Italy.

Medal summary

Medal table

Men's events

Women's events

Participating nations

See also
Short track speed skating
European Short Track Speed Skating Championships

External links
Detailed results
Results overview
Results book

European Short Track Speed Skating Championships
European Short Track Speed Skating Championships
European
European Short Track Speed Skating Championships
Sports competitions in Turin
International speed skating competitions hosted by Italy
2000s in Turin